Klosterbach may refer to:

Klosterbach (Große Aue), a river of North Rhine-Westphalia, Germany, tributary of the Große Aue
Klosterbach (Schwarzbach), a river of North Rhine-Westphalia, Germany, tributary of the Schwarzbach
Klosterbach (Varreler Bäke), a river of Lower Saxony, Germany, tributary of the Ochtum
Klosterbach (Danube), a river of Bavaria, Germany, tributary of the Danube